Mohammed Abdulrahman (Arabic:محمد عبدالرحمن) (born 10 April 1985) is a Qatari footballer.

External links
 

Chadian footballers
Qatari footballers
1985 births
Living people
Al-Arabi SC (Qatar) players
Al Kharaitiyat SC players
Place of birth missing (living people)
Qatar Stars League players
Qatari Second Division players
Association football defenders